The Nelson Rhodehouse House is a historic house located in the Cotuit village of Barnstable, Massachusetts.

Description and history 
The -story wood-frame house was built c. 1858 by Charles Baxter, a housewright, who sold it soon thereafter to Nelson Rhodehouse, a mariner. The house is a fine example of Greek Revival style, with a distinctive side entrance located in a porch that is recessed under the gable. The house is finished in flushboarding, giving the appearance of masonry, with corner pilasters.

The house was listed on the National Register of Historic Places on March 13, 1987.

See also
National Register of Historic Places listings in Barnstable County, Massachusetts

References

Houses in Barnstable, Massachusetts
National Register of Historic Places in Barnstable, Massachusetts
Houses on the National Register of Historic Places in Barnstable County, Massachusetts
Greek Revival architecture in Massachusetts
Houses completed in 1858